Death of a Naturalist (1966) is a collection of poems written by Seamus Heaney, who received the 1995 Nobel Prize in Literature. The collection was Heaney's first major published volume, and includes ideas that he had presented at meetings of The Belfast Group. Death of a Naturalist won the Cholmondeley Award, the Gregory Award, the Somerset Maugham Award, and the Geoffrey Faber Memorial Prize.

The work consists of 34 short poems and is largely concerned with childhood experiences and the formulation of adult identities, family relationships, and rural life. The collection begins with one of Heaney's best-known poems, "Digging", and includes the acclaimed "Death of a Naturalist" and "Mid-Term Break".

In 2022, Death of a Naturalist was included on the "Big Jubilee Read" list of 70 books by Commonwealth authors, selected to celebrate the Platinum Jubilee of Elizabeth II.

Poems
  
"Death of a Naturalist", the collection's second poem, details the exploits of a young boy collecting frogspawn from a flax-dam. The narrator remembers everything he saw and felt at those times. He then remembers his teacher telling him all about frogs in a section that speaks volumes about childhood innocence. Finally, we hear about a trip to the flax-dam that went wrong. He feels threatened by the frogs and flees. His interest in nature has gone – this is the death of a "naturalist" suggested in the poem's title. The poem makes extensive use of onomatopoeia and a simile that compares the behaviour of the amphibians to warfare ("Some sat poised like mud grenades") amongst other techniques.

"Mid-Term Break" is a reflection on the death of Heaney's younger brother, Christopher, while Heaney was at school. He describes his parents' different ways of displaying grief, visitors paying their respects, and his encounter of his brother's corpse in its coffin the next morning. The poem focuses on concrete particulars of Heaney's experience and "captures a boy's unfolding consciousness of death." The final line ("A four foot box, a foot for every year.") emphasizes death's finality.

"Digging" is one of Heaney's most-read poems. It addresses themes of time and history and the cyclical nature of the two through the narrators characterization of his father digging in the bog on their family farm. He admires his father's skill and relationship to the spade, but states that he will dig with his pen instead. This is significant as it demonstrates Heaney's ownership of his occupation as a poet and names his pen as his primary and most powerful tool. While excavating the mental bog of his mind by writing, Heaney believes he can gain a better understanding of the history living in the land around him, and a better understanding of himself.  

"Personal Helicon" is the final poem in Heaney's first collection. Helicon refers to the mountain in Greek mythology which is dedicated to the Greek God Apollo, who is the God of poetry. On the mountain live nine muses, each of whom represent a poetic inspiration. In Heaney's Helicon is a well which indicates that his inspiration comes from within the earth rather than above it. This theme resonates across his work in the poem "Digging" or in the later Bog Poems. He also states that he rhymes "to see myself", echoing the common theme found in the poem "Digging" that he uses poetry to understand the depths of the well and his reflection within it. Throughout the poem, Heaney walks the reader through each stage of his life up until the point he wrote Personal Helicon. He expresses to the reader how he loses sight of the outside inspirations he sought after as a child, and instead looks to himself. This can be seen when he states, "To stare, big-eyed Narcissus into some spring is beneath all adult dignity". In this quote he parallels himself to Narcissus, a hunter in Greek Mythology who is cursed to fall in love with his own reflection by the goddess Nemesis after he shuns Echo, an Oread nymph. The reader can see that for a short time after his college experience, Heaney relies on only himself for inspiration. Eventually he realizes his mistake, and unlike Narcissus, is able to bring himself back to reality.

Reception

Death of a Naturalist was received with mostly positive reviews and helped Heaney gain recognition on an international scale. Several of the poems had been published previously in pamphlets like "Eleven Poems" (1965) and gained  attention with reviews in the Belfast Telegraph, Death of a Naturalist received over 30 noteworthy reviews in Ireland, England and the United States. Fellow poets Michael Longley and Brendan Kennelly also praised Heaney's work. Critics generally remarked on Heaney's skilful use of metaphor and language as well as his attention to detail and rural imagery. Some reviewers found the volume a bit superfluous, John Unterecker of The New York Times Book Review stated that he found some poems possessed "a wit that is sometimes heavy-handed".

Contents 

 Digging
 Death of a Naturalist
 The Barn
 An Advancement of Learning
 Blackberry-Picking
 Churning Day
 The Early Purges
 Follower
 Ancestral Photograph
 Mid-Term Break
 Dawn Shoot
 At a Potato Digging
 For the Commander of the 'Eliza'
 The Diviner
 Turkeys Observed
 Cow in Calf
 Trout
 Waterfall
 Docker
 Poor Women in a City Church
 Gravities
 Twice Shy
 Valediction
 Lovers on Aran
 Poem
 Honeymoon Flight
 Scaffolding
 Storm on the Island
 Synge on Aran
 Saint Francis and the Birds
 In Small Townlands
 The Folk Singers
 The Play Way
 Personal Helicon

External links
Death of a Naturalist at Internet Archive

Further reading
 Allen, Michael, Ed. Seamus Heaney. Basingstoke : Macmillan, 1997.
 Cañadas, Ivan. "Working Nation(s): Seamus Heaney's 'Digging' and the Work Ethic in Post-Colonial and Minority Writing." EESE: Erfurt Electronic Studies in English (2010).
 Corcoran, Neil. The Poetry of Seamus Heaney: a Critical Study. London: Faber, 1998.
 Foster, John Wilson. The Achievement of Seamus Heaney. Dublin: The Lilliput Press, 1995.
 Garratt, Robert F., Ed., Critical Essays on Seamus Heaney. New York: G.K. Hall, 1995.
 Heaney, Seamus. New Selected Poems, 1966-1987. London & Boston: Faber and Faber, 1990.
 Heaney, Seamus. Seamus Heaney in Conversation with Karl Miller. London: Between The Lines, 2000.
 Mathias, Roland. "Death of a Naturalist", in The Art of Seamus Heaney, Ed. Tony Curtis, 3rd edn. Bridgen, Wales: Seren Books, 1994. pp. 11–25.
 Morrison, Blake. Seamus Heaney. London & New York: Methuen, 1982.
 Murphy, Andrew. Seamus Heaney. Plymouth: Northcote House / British Council, 1996.

See also
 Seamus Heaney Collected Poems

References

1966 poetry books
Irish poetry collections
Poetry by Seamus Heaney
Faber and Faber books